Rachel Goenka is an Indian restaurateur, chef, author and the founder and CEO of Mumbai based The Chocolate Spoon Company. She runs a chain of restaurants such as The Sassy Spoon, a European restaurant, House of Mandarin, a Chinese restaurant, Baraza Bars and Bites, a beach shack themed pub, Wicked China, an Asian resto-bar, and Sassy Teaspoon, a chain of patisseries and bakeries.

The Times of India's Times Hospitality Icons chose her as the Woman Entrepreneur of the Year in 2018, and she was named one of The CEO Magazine's 30 Women Entrepreneurs to Watch For in 2018. She has featured on the cover of magazines such as Feelings, Dogs N More, and Mother & Baby. She was awarded the Gourmand World Cookbook Award in 2020 for her book, Adventures with Mithai.

Early life and education  
Rachel Goenka graduated with degrees in Journalism and English from The Pennsylvania State University and then studied at The Ballymaloe Cookery School in Ireland, where Goenka was trained under celebrity chef Rachel Allen. After completing her graduation, she attended Le Cordon Bleu in London to specialize in patisserie.

Career 
She set up her first restaurant, The Sassy Spoon in Mumbai's Nariman Point in 2013, which was later chosen by French chef Alain Ducasse to be part of the Gout De France movement in 2014. Her second outlet of The Sassy Spoon was opened in Bandra, Mumbai in 2015.

In 2016, Goenka launched the Sassy Teaspoon, a chain of patisseries and bakeries across Mumbai and Pune. The Sassy Spoon, Mumbai won 'Best Independent Restaurant in India-Critics' Choice' within the first year of its operations. In 2017, she launched The House of Mandarin, an authentic Chinese diner.

Some of her other brands include Baraza Bars and Bites, a beach shack themed pub, and Wicked China, an Asian resto-bar. She owns seven restaurants across Mumbai and Pune, and 10 patisseries and two central kitchens.

Published works 
In 2019, she authored a book, Rachel Goenka's Adventures with Mithai, which was published by HarperCollins. The book was launched on 14 October 2019, in Mumbai. In December 2019, she won The Gourmand World Cookbook Award 2020, in the category of pastry and desserts for her book, Adventures with Mithai.

Personal life 
In February 2014, Goenka married her long-time boyfriend and Dubai based banker, Karan Khetarpal, with whom she has a son named Kabir. In April 2021, on her birthday, Rachel and Karan welcomed their daughter, Amalia. She is the daughter of Viveck Goenka, the chairman & MD of The Indian Express.

Accolades

References

External links 
 Rachel Goenka has South America on her 2020 bucketlist at The Economic Times
 "New tech players’ discounts is not sustainable model" at FNB News
 Dna exclusive: Why Sassy Spoon rocks the culinary boat at DNA India

Living people
Indian chefs
Indian restaurateurs
Indian food writers
Women food writers
Chefs of Indian cuisine
People from Mumbai
Women writers from Maharashtra
Donald P. Bellisario College of Communications alumni
1988 births